Maksim Pavlovich Stavtsev (born 29 January 2004) is a Russian football player. He plays for FC Zorkiy Krasnogorsk.

Club career
He made his debut in the Russian Premier League for FC Rostov on 19 June 2020 in a game against PFC Sochi. FC Rostov was forced to field their Under-18 squad in that game as their main squad was quarantined after six players tested positive for COVID-19.

References

External links
 
 
 

2004 births
Living people
Russian footballers
Association football forwards
Association football midfielders
FC Rostov players
Russian Premier League players